Lima is a town in Seminole County, Oklahoma, United States. The population was 53 at the 2010 census, a 28.4 percent decline from the figure of 74 recorded in 2000.

Geography
Lima is located at  (35.173362, -96.598337).

It was named after Lima, Ohio, the native home of a first settler.

Demographics

As of the census of 2000, there were 74 people, 30 households, and 18 families residing in the town. There were 39 housing units at an average density of 84.3 per square mile (32.7/km2). The racial makeup of the town was 43.24% White, 36.49% African American, 5.41% Native American, and 14.86% from two or more races. Hispanic or Latino of any race were 2.70% of the population.

There were 30 households, out of which 13.3% had children under the age of 18 living with them, 40.0% were married couples living together, 16.7% had a female householder with no husband present, and 36.7% were non-families. 33.3% of all households were made up of individuals, and 10.0% had someone living alone who was 65 years of age or older. The average household size was 2.47 and the average family size was 3.05.

In the town, the population was spread out, with 28.4% under the age of 18, 5.4% from 18 to 24, 18.9% from 25 to 44, 33.8% from 45 to 64, and 13.5% who were 65 years of age or older. The median age was 44 years. For every 100 females, there were 117.6 males. For every 100 females age 18 and over, there were 89.3 males.

The median income for a household in the town was $18,750, and the median income for a family was $15,625. Males had a median income of $23,125 versus $14,375 for females. The per capita income for the town was $6,473. There were 47.4% of families and 59.7% of the population living below the poverty line, including 70.4% of under eighteens and 40.0% of those over 64.

Sports
New Lima High School has won four Oklahoma High School Boys Class B Championships in 1967, 1968, 1977, and 1978.  Center Eddie Louie was named the Oklahoma state Boys' Basketball Player of the Year for 1978.  Jim Knapp, New Lima long time coach, won the state’s Boys' Basketball Coach of the Year in 1978; he also won the title in 1973.  Louie also led the team to the state’s Tournament of Champions Champion earlier that season.  The Oklahoman named the 1978 New Lima Boys Basketball team as the #24 "best in sports," noting, "1978 New Lima boys basketball: 31-0.  Tiny Class B state champs also won Tournament of Champions, beating Tulsa Washington. Senior stars Eddie Louie and George Allen finished careers 113-10 with two state crowns."

They also won the 1978 Class B Baseball State Championship over Eakly, 3-0.

The New Lima girls continued the school's winning basketball tradition: winning the 1984 and 1985 Girls Class B Championships.

See also
New Lima Public Schools

See also
 Boley, Brooksville, Clearview, Grayson, Langston, Redbird, Rentiesville, Summit, Taft, Tatums, Tullahassee, and Vernon, other "All-Black" settlements that were part of the Land Run of 1889.

References

External links
 All-Black Towns in Oklahoma

Towns in Seminole County, Oklahoma
Towns in Oklahoma
Populated places in Oklahoma established by African Americans
Pre-statehood history of Oklahoma